Pseliastis is genus of moths of the family Heliozelidae. It was described by Edward Meyrick in 1897.

Species
 Pseliastis spectropa
 Pseliastis trizona
 Pseliastis xanthodisca

References

Heliozelidae
Adeloidea genera